Newk may refer to:

Don Newcombe (1926–2019), American baseball player
Sonny Rollins (born 1930), American jazz musician

See also
Newk's Eatery, American cafe chain
Newark Newks, former baseball team
Nuke (disambiguation)